Howland may refer to:

Places
In the United States:
 Howland, Maine, a New England town
 Howland (CDP), Maine, the main village in the town
 Howland, Missouri
 Howland Township, Trumbull County, Ohio
 Howland Island, an uninhabited coral island that is an unorganized territory of the United States
 Howland Hook Marine Terminal, a container port facility on Staten Island, New York City, United States

People
Howland J. Hamlin (1850–1909), American lawyer and politician
Howland (surname)

Buildings
The Howland Cultural Center in Beacon, New York, named for Joseph Howland

Awards
Howland Memorial Prize, awarded to a "citizen of any country in recognition of some achievement of marked distinction in the field of literature or fine arts or the science of government"